Tapulesatele Mauteni Tamasone Metuli II Esera (1951 - 8 December 2021) was a Samoan politician who served as a member of the Legislative Assembly of Samoa from 2016 to 2021. He was a member of the Human Rights Protection Party.

Tapulesatele won a scholarship to study mechanical engineering in New Zealand, then worked for Samoa's Public Works Department and as an inspector for the Department of Labour. He later ran a bus service and an automotive business. In 2010 he graduated from the University of Otago with a master's degree in Indigenous Studies.

He was first elected to the Legislative Assembly at the 2016 Samoan general election. In parliament, he criticised Samoa's lack of teachers. He lost his seat in the 2021 election. He died in New Zealand after travelling there for medical treatment.

References

1951 births
2021 deaths
Members of the Legislative Assembly of Samoa
Human Rights Protection Party politicians
University of Otago alumni